Catarina Ferreira (born 9 February 1984) is a Portuguese former professional tennis player. She reached career-high WTA rankings of 456 in singles and 401 in doubles.

ITF Circuit finals

Singles (0–1)

Doubles (5–4)

External links
 
 

1984 births
Living people
Portuguese female tennis players
Sportspeople from Lisbon
21st-century Portuguese women